Makajapingo is a village in Boven Saramacca (resort) in Sipaliwini District in Suriname. The village is inhabited by Matawai people.

Nearby towns and villages include Pakka-Pakka (8.6 nm), Moetoetoetabriki (7.0 nm), Tabrikiekondre (3.2 nm),  Stonkoe (3.2 nm) and Warnakomoponafaja (2.0 nm).

The villages does not have a school or a clinic, but does have a church, and unlike most Matawai settlements, it is Catholic.

References

Matawai settlements
Populated places in Sipaliwini District